The Sawtooth Range,  el. , is a small mountain range west of Choteau, Montana in Teton County, Montana.

See also
 List of mountain ranges in Montana
 Old Baldy (Montana)

Notes

Mountain ranges of Montana
Landforms of Teton County, Montana
Ranges of the Rocky Mountains